"Student Demonstration Time" is a song by the American rock band the Beach Boys from their 1971 album Surf's Up. It is an altered version of Jerry Lieber and Mike Stoller's "Riot in Cell Block Number 9" with new lyrics by Mike Love.

Background and lyrics
The song which "Student Demonstration Time" is based on—"Riot in Cell Block Number 9"—was originally written by Jerry Leiber and Mike Stoller in 1954, and was considered for inclusion on the Beach Boys' 1965 album Party!, but was ultimately not included. The song was subsequently performed live by the Beach Boys in concert starting in 1969. In mid-1970, Mike Love re-wrote the lyrics after learning of the Kent State Shootings where four unarmed college students protesting the Cambodian Campaign were killed by the Ohio National Guard on Monday, May 4, 1970. Stephen Desper, engineer of the Beach Boys during this period, explained the genesis and context behind the song:

Other events referred to in the song include (in order of appearance):
 Autumn 1964 – Berkeley Free Speech Movement
 May 1969 – People's Park, also in Berkeley, California
 June 1970 – rioting in Isla Vista, California
 May 14–15, 1970 – Jackson State killings
 May 4, 1970 – Kent State shootings

Release
"Student Demonstration Time" (backed with "Don't Go Near the Water") was released as a single in the Netherlands—where it peaked at #21—and Italy, as well as Australia, where it charted during 1972. However, for the British and German releases of the single, the A-side and B-side were switched, resulting in "Don't Go Near the Water" being the A-side.

Reception
According to Jack Rieley, the band's manager at the time, "Student Demonstration Time" "had Carl and I blushing with embarrassment", while Dennis was "thoroughly disgusted". Brian disliked the song, saying that the lyrical content was "too intense".

Personnel
Credits from Craig Slowinski

The Beach Boys
Al Jardine - backing vocals 
Bruce Johnston - backing vocals
Mike Love - lead and backing vocals, tambourine
Carl Wilson - backing vocals, electric guitars
Dennis Wilson - backing vocals, drums

Additional musicians
Blondie Chaplin - bass guitar
Daryl Dragon - tack piano, Moog synthesizer
Glenn Ferris - trombone
Sal Marquez - trumpet
Roger Neumann - tenor saxophone
Joel Peskin - tenor saxophone
Mike Price - trumpet

See also
List of anti-war songs

References

1971 songs
The Beach Boys songs
Songs written by Jerry Leiber and Mike Stoller
Songs written by Mike Love
Song recordings produced by the Beach Boys
Anti-war songs